The Bowling competition at the World Games 2017 took place from July 21 to July 24, in Wrocław in Poland, at the Sky Tower.

Participating nations

 Canada (4)
 China (2)
 Chinese Taipei (4)
 Colombia (4)
 Denmark (4)
 Finland (4)
 Germany (4)
 Great Britain (2)
 Hong Kong (2)
 India (2)
 Japan (4)
 Mexico (4)
 Netherlands (2)
 Ukraine (2)
 Poland (4)
 Singapore (4)
 South Korea (4)
 United States (4)
 Venezuela (4)

Medals table

Medalists

Laura Buethner of Germany originally won gold in women's singles. but Buethner tested positive for a banned substance. As a result of the positive doping test, Buethner was stripped of the gold medal. Kelly Kulick, who originally won silver, was awarded the gold medal. Clara Guerrero, who originally won bronze, was awarded the silver medal and Daria Kovalova, originally fourth in the final standings, was awarded the bronze medal.

References

External links
 Results book

 
2017 World Games
World Games
2017